Teresa ("Terri") Anne Scandura is Warren C. Johnson Endowed Chair and Professor of Management at the University of Miami, in the School of Business Administration. She is Academic Director for the Master of Science in Leadership Program at University of Miami. From 2007 to 2012, Scandura was Dean of the University of Miami Graduate School.

She is author of Essentials of Organizational Behavior: An Evidence-Based Approach and Management Today: Best practices for a modern workplace. Scandura's research specialties include leader-member exchange, leadership, mentorship, teams, and applied research methods.

Selected Publications 

 Scandura, T. A. & Meuser, J. D. (2022). Relational Dynamics of Leadership. Annual Review of Organizational Psychology and Organizational Behavior, 9, 309-337.
 Dasborough, M. & Scandura, T. A. (2022). Leading Through the Crisis: "Hands Off" or "Hands-On"? Journal of Leadership and Organizational Studies, 29, 2, 219-223. DOI: 10.1177/15480518211036472
 Scandura, T. A. (2020). Essentials of Organizational Behavior: An evidence-based approach. SAGE Publications; ISBN 978-1544396798 (Winner of the 2022 Textbook Excellence Award from the Textbook & Academic Authors Association (TAA))
 Scandura, T. A. & Gower, K. (2019). Management today: Best practices for the modern workplace. SAGE Publications; ISBN 978-1506385884
 Scandura, T. A. & Mouriño, E. (Eds.) Leading Diversity in the 21st Century. (2017). Information Age Publishing; ISBN 978-1681238760
 Scandura, T. A. & Pellegrini, E. K. (2008). Trust and Leader—Member Exchange: A close look at relational vulnerability. Journal of Leadership & Organizational Studies, 15, 2, 101-110.
 Pellegrini, E. K. & Scandura, T. A. (2005). Construct Equivalence across Groups: An unexplored issue in mentoring research. Educational and Psychological Measurement, 65, 2, 323-335.
 Lankau, M. J. & Scandura, T. A. (2002). An Investigation of Personal Learning in Mentoring Relationships: Content, antecedents, and consequences. Academy of Management Journal, 45, 4, 779-790.
 Scandura, T. A. & Williams, E. A. (2000). Research Methodology in Management: Current practices, trends, and implications for future research. Academy of Management Journal, 43, 6. 1248-1264.
 Scandura, T. A. (1992). Mentorship and Career Mobility: An empirical investigation. Journal of Organizational Behavior, 13, 2, 169-174.
 Scandura, T. A. (1987). Toward a Psychology of Dyadic Organizing. Research in Organizational Behavior, 9, 175-208.
 Scandura, T. A. (1984). Moderating Effects of Initial Leader-Member Exchange Status on the Effects of a Leadership Intervention. Journal of Applied Psychology, 69, 3, 428-436.

References

External links 

 http://terriscandura.com/

University of Miami faculty
University of Cincinnati alumni